The Four Last Seconds of Quidam Uhl is a 1924 German silent drama film directed by Robert Reinert and starring Carl de Vogt, Helena Makowska and John Mylong. The film was not a success on its release.

Cast
 Carl de Vogt as Quidam Uhl
 Helena Makowska as Evelyne
 John Mylong as Heinrich, Magdalensa Bruder
 Karl Falkenberg as Man crushed by Boats
 Claire Kronburger as Magdalena, Quidams Verlobte

References

Bibliography
 David Bordwell. Poetics of cinema. Routledge, 2008.

External links

1924 films
Films of the Weimar Republic
German silent feature films
Films directed by Robert Reinert
German black-and-white films
1920s German films